Luis Sardella (born 11 July 1911, date of death unknown) was an Argentine boxer. He competed in the men's welterweight event at the 1932 Summer Olympics.

References

External links
 

1911 births
Year of death missing
Argentine male boxers
Olympic boxers of Argentina
Boxers at the 1932 Summer Olympics
Boxers from Buenos Aires
Welterweight boxers